The 2008 Rhode Island Democratic presidential primary took place on March 4, 2008. It was an open primary. 21 delegates were awarded on a proportional basis.  Rhode Island's delegation to the 2008 Democratic National Convention also included 11 superdelegates whose votes were not bound by the results of the primary election. Hillary Clinton won the primary.

Delegate breakdown
The Rhode Island Democratic Party sent a total of 32 delegates to the 2008 Democratic National Convention. Of those delegates, 21 were pledged, and 11 were unpledged.  All of the 21 pledged delegates were allocated (pledged) to vote for a particular candidate at the National Convention according to the results of the Rhode Island Presidential Primary.  The 11 unpledged delegates were popularly called "superdelegates" because their vote represented their personal decisions, whereas the regular delegates' votes represented the collective decision of many voters.  The superdelegates were free to vote for any candidate at the National Convention and were selected by the Rhode Island Democratic Party's officials.

The 21 pledged delegates were further divided into 13 district delegates and 8 statewide delegates. The 13 district delegates were divided among Rhode Island's 19 Congressional Districts and were allocated to the presidential candidates based on the primary results in each District.  Congressional District 1 chose 6 delegates and Congressional District 2 chose 7 delegates. The 8 statewide delegates were divided into 5 at-large delegates and 3 Party Leaders and Elected Officials (abbreviated PLEOs). They were allocated to the presidential candidates based on the primary results statewide.

Of the 11 unpledged delegates, 10 were selected in advance and 1 was selected at the State Executive Committee meeting on June 19, 2008.  The delegates selected in advance were 6 Democratic National Committee members; the two Democratic U.S. Representatives from Rhode Island, Patrick J. Kennedy (District 1) and James Langevin (District 2); and both Democratic U.S. senators from Rhode Island, Jack Reed and Sheldon Whitehouse.

Polling

On March 2, 2008, the most recent opinion polling of likely Democratic Primary participants showed Senator Clinton leading her opponent, Senator Barack Obama, 42% to 37%, with 22% undecided.

Among Rhode Island's 11 superdelegates, ten had endorsed a candidate by February 2.  Eight had announced support for Senator Hillary Clinton, and two had committed to Senator Barack Obama.

Results

See also
 2008 Democratic Party presidential primaries
 2008 Rhode Island Republican presidential primary

References

Rhode Island
2008 Rhode Island elections
2008